Blues is the fourth studio album by Polish blues rock band Breakout. It was released in February 1971 in Poland through Polskie Nagrania "Muza", and re-released by the same label in 1986, 2005 (CD) and 2007. Another CD version of the album was released in 2000 through Yesterday Records. The cover art and photos was created by Marek A. Karewicz. Blues is often considered the best album of Breakout's career.

Blues is considered to be one of the most important albums in the history of Polish rock.

Track listing
Lyrics by Bogdan Loebl.  Music by Tadeusz Nalepa.

Personnel
Tadeusz Nalepa - vocal, guitar
Dariusz Kozakiewicz - guitar
Tadeusz Trzciński - harmonica
Jerzy Goleniewski - bass
Józef Hajdasz - drums

Release history

References

1971 albums
Breakout (band) albums
Polish-language albums
Polskie Nagrania Muza albums